The 2008 AF2 season was the ninth season of the AF2. It was preceded by 2007 and succeeded by 2009. The regular season began on Friday, March 28 and ended on Saturday, July 26.  The league champions were the Tennessee Valley Vipers, who beat the Spokane Shock in ArenaCup IX.

League info

Standings

 Green indicates clinched playoff berth
 Purple indicates division champion
 Gray indicates best conference record

Playoffs

ArenaCup IX

ArenaCup IX was the 2008 edition of the AF2's championship game, played on Monday, August 25, 2008, in which the American Conference Champions Tennessee Valley Vipers defeated the National Conference Champion Spokane Shock in Spokane, Washington by a score of 56–55 in overtime.

Notable firsts
First time since ArenaCup V in 2005 that the game was hosted at the higher seed's home venue (in the meantime, the Cup was held at neutral sites such as Bossier City and San Juan).  It is also the first ArenaCup where the home team lost.
First ArenaCup ever to go into overtime.
First ArenaCup win for the Tennessee Valley Vipers, one of the original AF2 franchises who have played eight seasons so far.

References

External links
2008 af2 Stats
 Arena Cup IX Stats

Af2 seasons